Sumner Shapiro (January 13, 1926 – November 14, 2006) was a United States Navy rear admiral who served as Director of the Office of Naval Intelligence from 1978 to 1982.

Early life and education
Born in Nashua, New Hampshire, Shapiro attended the University of New Hampshire before World War II service in the U.S. Army Air Corps.  He was a 1949 graduate of the United States Naval Academy and a veteran of the Korean War. He earned a Master's degree in International Affairs from George Washington University.

Military career
Throughout the 1950s he served in the Office of Naval Intelligence, reporting to Chief of Naval Operation Arleigh Burke, as well as serving stints in Moscow and London. He was a graduate of the Naval War College and the U.S. Army's Institute for Advanced Soviet and Eastern European Studies in Germany. He was appointed Rear Admiral September 1, 1976; he was simultaneously D/DNI and commander of the Naval Intelligence Command.  From 1978 to 1982, he was 51st Director of Naval Intelligence.

During his career Shapiro received the Navy Distinguished Service Medal, the Legion of Merit, and the Navy Commendation Medal. Shapiro had a strong influence on United States Cold War naval strategy.

Jonathan Pollard
Shortly into his career as an intelligence analyst, convicted Israeli spy Jonathan Pollard had his security clearance reduced by Shapiro after presenting a plan to garner intelligence from South Africa. According to The Washington Post, Sumner dismissed Pollard as a "kook". "I wish the hell I'd fired him," Shapiro would later opine.

Shapiro, who was himself Jewish, stated that he was troubled by the support of Jewish organizations for Pollard:  "We work so hard to establish ourselves and to get where we are, and to have somebody screw it up... and then to have Jewish organizations line up behind this guy and try to make him out a hero of the Jewish people, it bothers the hell out of me".

Shapiro was among four former directors of Naval intelligence (alongside William Studeman, John Butts and Thomas Brooks) who wrote a livid response to Israeli negotiations to free Pollard, which was published in the Washington Post:

Personal life
Shapiro and his wife Eleanor Hymen "Jimmie" Shapiro (October 4, 1923 - November 3, 2020) are buried at the United States Naval Academy Cemetery. The couple had a son, two daughters and four grandchildren.

Memorials
The National Intelligence Professionals society offers a scholarship named for RADM Sumner Shapiro.

References

1926 births
2006 deaths
People from Nashua, New Hampshire
University of New Hampshire alumni
Jewish American military personnel
United States Army Air Forces personnel of World War II
United States Naval Academy alumni
United States Navy personnel of the Korean War
Elliott School of International Affairs alumni
United States Navy admirals
Recipients of the Navy Distinguished Service Medal
Recipients of the Legion of Merit
Directors of the Office of Naval Intelligence
Recipients of the National Intelligence Distinguished Service Medal
Burials at the United States Naval Academy Cemetery